Jacomb is a surname, and may refer to:

 Agnes E. Jacomb (1866–1949), English novelist 
 Albert E. Jacomb (–1946), British printer and founding member of the Socialist Party of Great Britain
 John Jacomb (1841–1891), Australian cricketer
 Martin Jacomb (born 1929), British barrister and businessman
 Robert Jacomb (1680–1732), English financier and politician
 Thomas Jacomb (1622–1687), ejected English minister